René Maran (5 November 1887 – 9 May 1960) was a French poet and novelist, and the first black writer to win the French Prix Goncourt (in 1921).

Biography
Maran was born on the boat carrying his parents to Fort-de-France, Martinique where he lived until the age of seven. After that he went to Gabon, where his father Héménéglide Maran was in the colonial service. After attending boarding school in Bordeaux, France, he joined the French Colonial service in French Equatorial Africa.  It was his experience there that was the basis for many of his novels, including Batouala: A True Black Novel, which won the Prix Goncourt. 

W. E. B. Du Bois applauded Maran, saying of his writings in an article which would be incorporated into the pivotal Harlem Renaissance text The New Negro, "Maran's attack on France and on the black French deputy from Senegal has gone into the courts and marks an era. Never before have Negroes criticized the work of the French in Africa."

Jean-Paul Sartre alluded to Maran in his preface to Frantz Fanon's The Wretched of the Earth, mocking the French establishment's complacent self-congratulation that they had "on one occasion given the Prix Goncourt to a Negro".
His novel Un Homme pareil aux autres is the subject of extensive analysis in the third chapter of Fanon's Black Skin, White Masks.

Tribute
On 5 November 2019 Google celebrated his 132nd birthday with a Google Doodle.

Selected works
 1909 : La Maison du Bonheur (poetry)
 1912 : La Vie intérieure, poems 1909–1912, Paris, Ed. du Beffroi, 157 p.
 1921 : Batouala, Prix Goncourt, Paris, Ed. Albin Michel, 169 p. 
 1922 : Le Visage calme, Paris, Ed. du Monde nouveau, 87 p.
 1924 : Le Petit Roi de Chimérie, Paris, Ed. Albin Michel, 237 p.
 1927 : Djouma, chien de Brousse, novel, Paris, Ed. Albin Michel, 253 p.
 1931 : Le Cœur serré, autobiographie, Paris, Ed. Albin Michel, 252 p. 
 1931 : Asepsie noire !, Paris- Laboratoire Martinet, 45 p., illustrations.
 1934 : Le Livre de la Brousse, novel, Paris, Ed. Albin Michel, 287 p.  
 1935 : Les Belles images, poems, Bordeaux, Ed. Delmas, 83 p.
 1938 : Livingstone et l'Exploration de l'Afrique, Paris, Gallimard,  collection La découverte du monde, 276 p. 
 1941 : Bêtes de la brousse, Paris, Ed. Albin Michel, 253 p. 
 1941 : Brazza et la Fondation de l'A.E.F, Paris, Gallimard, La découverte du monde  collection, 307 p. 
 1943 : Les Pionniers de l'Empire (book 1), Paris, Ed. Albin Michel, 331 p.
Arc-en-Ciel, 187 p. 
 1944 : Peine de cœur, Paris, S.P.L.E., Ed. Univers, 207 p.
 1946 : Les Pionniers de l'Empire (book 2), Paris, Ed. Albin Michel, 413 p.
 1947 : Un homme pareil aux autres, Paris, Ed. Arc-en-Ciel, 248 p. 
 1951 : Savorgnan de Brazza, Paris, Éditions du Dauphin, 246 p., ill.
 1957 : Félix Eboué, grand commis et loyal serviteur, 1885-1944, Paris, Éditions Parisiennes.
 1953 : Bacouya, le Cynocéphale, novel, Ed. Albin Michel, 240 p.
 1958 : Le Livre du souvenir,

Further reading

 Ojo-Ade, Femi. René Maran, the Black Frenchman: A Bio-Critical Study, Three Continents Press, Washington, 1984, 265 p.

References

External links

1887 births
1960 deaths
People born at sea
People from Fort-de-France
Martiniquais writers
20th-century French novelists
Prix Goncourt winners
French people of Gabonese descent
French male poets
French male novelists
20th-century French poets
20th-century French male writers